= Meidai =

Meidai may refer to:

- Nagoya University
- Meiji University
